Pareherwenemef (“Re is with his left arm”) was an ancient Egyptian prince of the 20th Dynasty, a son of pharaoh Ramesses III. Just like several of his brothers, he was named after a son of Ramesses II, whom Ramesses III tried to emulate (see Pareherwenemef). He is depicted in his father's mortuary temple at Medinet Habu. Both he and his brother Khaemwaset are called firstborn sons of the king; they were possibly the firstborns of different wives. He was buried in QV42.

Sources

Ancient Egyptian princes
People of the Twentieth Dynasty of Egypt
Ramesses III